Coleophora lasloella is a moth of the family Coleophoridae. It is found in Algeria, Tunisia, Saudi Arabia, the United Arab Emirates and Yemen.

References

lasloella
Moths described in 1982
Moths of the Arabian Peninsula
Moths of Africa